Onan is a 2009 Indian action thriller film. It is the debut film of writer/director Shyam Madhavan Sarada. The Tamil/English guerrilla film was shot in the Indian cities of Chennai and Kochi with a mainly amateur cast.

Plot

Cast
 Ramar Ramamoorthy as Charlie
 David W. Williams as Chopper
 Kaamatchinaadhan as Thambi
 Kabirdas Madhavan as Dev
 Dawn Akemi as Jenny
 Heera Selvaraj as Heera

Onan features an ensemble cast and marks the feature debut of Ramar Ramamoorthy, David W. Williams and Kabirdas Madhavan as actors. Onan also features Kollywood actors Kaamatchinadhan and Heera Selvaraj. Actor Dawn Akemi appears in an Indian movie for the first time.

Awards
Onan was an official selection at the Global Cinema Festival 2009, and featured in the "Vista India" section.

References

External links
 

2009 films
2009 action thriller films
Indian independent films
Films set in India 
Films shot in Chennai

2000s Tamil-language films
2009 directorial debut films
Indian action thriller films
2009 independent films

es:Camaleón
fr:Caméléon
it:Camaleonte